Claiborne Green Latimer (1893–1960) was an American mathematician, known for the Latimer–MacDuffee theorem.

Career
Latimer earned his PhD in 1924 from the University of Chicago under Leonard Dickson with thesis Arithmetic of Generalized Quaternion Algebras. He was an assistant professor at Tulane University for 2 years, before becoming a mathematics professor at the University of Kentucky in 1927. After 20 years at the University of Kentucky, he resigned in 1947 and became a professor at Emory University. Latimer was an amateur photographer; some of his photographs are preserved in the archives of the University of Kentucky and Emory University.

References

1893 births
1960 deaths
20th-century American mathematicians
Emory University faculty
University of Chicago alumni
University of Kentucky faculty
Mathematicians from Kentucky